Nathaniel Highmore may refer to:
 Nathaniel Highmore (surgeon) (1613–1685), British surgeon and anatomist
 Sir Nathaniel Highmore (barrister) (1844–1924), British civil servant and barrister